The 188th Pennsylvania House of Representatives District is located in Southeast Pennsylvania and has been represented since 2021 by Rick Krajewski.

District profile
The 188th Pennsylvania House of Representatives District is located in Philadelphia County and encompasses the University of Pennsylvania and the University of the Sciences. It also includes the following areas:

 Ward 27
 Ward 46
 Ward 51 [PART, Divisions 02, 04, 05, 06, 13, 14, 15, 16, 17, 18, 19, 20, 26 and 28]
 Ward 60 [PART, Divisions 01, 02, 03 and 23]

Representatives

Recent election results

References

External links
District map from the United States Census Bureau
Pennsylvania House Legislative District Maps from the Pennsylvania Redistricting Commission.  
Population Data for District 188 from the Pennsylvania Redistricting Commission.

Government of Philadelphia
188